Sorkh Qaleh Rural District is a rural district (dehestan) in the Central District of Qaleh Ganj County, Kerman Province, Iran. At the 2006 census, its population was 19,860, in 4,220 families. The rural district has 50 villages.

References

Qaleh Ganj County
Rural Districts of Kerman Province